Guillaume Lamberty (22 April 1754 in Pontchâteau to 17 April 1794) was a French revolutionary.

He was involved as adjutant-general in the Drownings at Nantes during the French Revolution.

He was later condemned to death by the Bignon Commission and guillotined.

References 

French people executed by guillotine during the French Revolution
French revolutionaries
1754 births
1794 deaths